In the United States under the Securities Act of 1933, any offer to sell securities must either be registered with the United States Securities and Exchange Commission (SEC) or meet certain qualifications to exempt it from such registration. Regulation A (or Reg A) contains rules providing exemptions from the registration requirements, allowing some companies to use equity crowdfunding to offer and sell their securities without having to register the securities with the SEC. Regulation A offerings are intended to make access to capital possible for small and medium-sized companies that could not otherwise bear the costs of a normal SEC registration and to allow nonaccredited investors to participate in the offering. The regulation is found under Title 17 of the Code of Federal Regulations, chapter 2, part 230. The legal citation is 17 C.F.R. §230.251 et seq.

On March 25, 2015, the SEC issued new final regulations amending Regulation A. Montana and Massachusetts state regulators sued the SEC requesting a stay that would pause the implementation of Reg A. The rules came into force on July 19, 2015.

Regulation A+
On March 25, 2015, the Securities and Exchange Commission  adopted final rules to implement Section 401 of the Jumpstart Our Business Startups Act by expanding Regulation A into two tiers.
 Tier 1, for securities offerings of up to $20 million in a 12-month period 
 Tier 2, for securities offerings of up to $75 million in a 12-month period 
An issuer of $20 million or less of securities can elect to proceed under either Tier 1 or Tier 2. The final rules for offerings under Tier 1 and Tier 2 build on current Regulation A and preserve, with some modifications, existing provisions regarding issuer eligibility, Offering circular contents, testing the waters, and "bad actor" disqualification. The new rules modernize the Regulation A filing process for all offerings, align practice in certain areas with prevailing practice for registered offerings, create additional flexibility for issuers in the offering process, and establish an ongoing reporting regime for certain Regulation A issuers. Under the final rules, Tier 2 issuers are required to include audited financial statements in their offering documents and to file annual, semiannual, and current reports with the SEC on an ongoing basis. On March 15, 2021, businesses using Tier 2 will be able to raise up to $75 million in capital within a 12-month period, as opposed to the previous limit of $50 million (cf. $1 million per state).

Nonaccredited Investors

Regulation A allows the general public to invest in private companies. With the exception of securities that will be listed on a national securities exchange upon qualification, purchasers in Tier 2 offerings must either be accredited investors, as that term is defined in Regulation D (SEC), or be subject to certain limitations on the size of their investment.

Tier 1
In addition to qualifying a Regulation A offering with the SEC, companies using a Tier 1 offering must register or qualify their offering in any state in which they seek to offer or sell securities pursuant to Regulation A.  Some states provide the option to have Tier 1 offerings that will be conducted in multiple states reviewed through a coordinated state review program by the North American Securities Administrators Association.

Tier 2
Issuers in Tier 2 offerings are required to qualify offerings with the Commission before sales can be made pursuant to Regulation A, but they are not required to register or qualify their offerings with state securities regulators. This partially exempts Tier 2 companies from blue sky law securities rules in each state. Tier 2 offerings by such issuers do remain subject to some state law enforcement and antifraud rules. Issuers in Tier 2 offerings may still be subject to filing fees in the states in which they intend to offer securities.

Notable Offerings

Equity crowdfunding platforms CrowdEngine, StartEngine and SeedInvest have facilitated Regulation A+ campaigns. The first successful Regulation A+ campaign was completed by automotive startup Elio Motors, raising nearly $17 million from 6,600 investors. The campaign was designed, produced and marketed by CrowdfundX, a financial marketing firm based in Los Angeles. Elio Motors closed out their Regulation A+ offering in February, 2016, and subsequently listed to the OTCQX, making it the first crowdfinanced IPO in the United States. In July, 2017, Myomo, a medical device maker out of Boston, MA, became the first crowdfinanced IPO to list shares to the NYSE. CrowdfundX also marketed this historic Reg A+ IPO.

The first real estate lending marketplace to obtain SEC qualification utilizing an amended Tier 1 Regulation A offering was Groundfloor, achieving the feat on August 31, 2015. This made Groundfloor the first marketplace open to nonaccredited investors.

On Dec. 3rd, 2015, real estate crowdfunding company Fundrise used the newly expanded Regulation A rules to raise capital for the launch of the world's first online Real Estate Investment Trust.

On Apr. 26th, 2021, fine wine and spirit investment firm Vint qualified under Regulation A to offer collections of fine wine and spirits on the world's first online fine wine and spirits investment platform.

In June 2016, American Homeowner Preservation opened a Regulation A+ offering with what has been called "probably the lowest investment minimum" of any Regulation A+ offering.  Their minimum investment is $100.

Testing The Waters
Regulation A allows companies to conduct a publicity campaign and to solicit indications of interest from the public to assess the level of interest in investing in the company. This is intended to help the company decide whether to proceed with a Reg A offering.

References

External links
United States Securities and Exchange Commission (SEC) – Official site
Adopting Release for the amendments to Regulation A
Guidance on the Application of Regulation A

U.S. Securities and Exchange Commission
United States securities law
Crowdfunding